Hilario Grajeda (born February 9, 1967) is an American soccer referee.  He has been a referee in Major League Soccer since 2004. His first match in the MLS was a game between Dallas Burn and Kansas City Wizards in July 2004. On July 31, 2013, he was the first referee to try out the "Ref Cam" in a friendly game between A.S. Roma and MLS All-Stars, a head-mounted camera that gives the fans the opportunity to see the game in the referee's point of view. After 2018, Grajeda transition to primarily performing the role of Video Assistant Referee.

Card statistics

Honors
 MLS Referee of the Year: 2013

References

External links
  (archive)
 

1967 births
Living people
American soccer referees
Major League Soccer referees
North American Soccer League referees